Klas Julius Lundström (19 February 1889 – 26 March 1951) was a Swedish track and field athlete who competed in the 1912 Summer Olympics. He finished 13th in the individual cross country competition (ca. 12 km). This was the sixth best Swedish result, so he was not awarded with a medal in the team cross country competition, where only the best three were honored. He also participated in the 5000 m event but failed to reach the final.

References

1889 births
1951 deaths
Swedish male long-distance runners
Olympic athletes of Sweden
Athletes (track and field) at the 1912 Summer Olympics
Olympic cross country runners
People from Piteå
Sportspeople from Norrbotten County